Stephen Bainbridge (born 7 October 1956) is a former  international rugby union player. In 1983 he toured with the British and Irish Lions on their tour to New Zealand and in the 1987 Rugby World Cup. He played amongst other teams for club rugby for Fylde, Gosforth and Orrell R.U.F.C.

References

External links
 Lions rugby profile
 Orrell history

1956 births
Living people
English rugby union players
British & Irish Lions rugby union players from England
England international rugby union players
Rugby union locks
Fylde Rugby Club players
Rugby union players from Newcastle upon Tyne
Newcastle Falcons players